Cruzeiro do Sul International Airport  is the airport serving Cruzeiro do Sul, Brazil. It is the westernmost Brazilian airport served by scheduled flights.

It is operated by Vinci SA.

History
The airport was commissioned on October 28, 1970.

Previously operated by Infraero, on April 7, 2021 Vinci SA won a 30-year concession to operate the airport.

Airlines and destinations

Accidents and incidents
22 June 1992: a VASP cargo Boeing 737-2A1C registration PP-SND en route from Rio Branco to Cruzeiro do Sul crashed in the jungle while on arrival procedures to Cruzeiro do Sul. The crew of 2 and 1 occupant died. 
29 October 2009: a Brazilian Air Force Cessna 208 Caravan registration FAB-2725 en route from Cruzeiro do Sul to Tabatinga made an emergency landing on a river due engine failure. Of the 11 occupants, 1 passenger and 1 crew member died.

Access

See also

List of airports in Brazil

References

External links

Airports in Acre (state)
Airports established in 1970